Pyromys is a subgenus of Mus. Species are endemic to South Asia and parts of Southeast Asia.

Species
Ceylon spiny mouse, Mus fernandoni (Sri Lanka)
Phillips's mouse, Mus phillipsi (Southwestern India)
Flat-haired mouse, Mus platythrix (India)
Rock-loving mouse, Mus saxicola (Southern Pakistan, southern Nepal, and India)
Shortridge's mouse, Mus shortridgei (Myanmar to southwestern Cambodia and northwestern Vietnam)

Animal subgenera